Służew Cemetery may refer to the:
 Służew Old Cemetery at the Renety Street in Warsaw, Poland
 Służew New Cemetery at the Wałbrzyska Street in Warsaw, Poland